Deb Patterson is an American politician from the state of Oregon. A Democrat, she has been a member of the Oregon State Senate since January 2021.

Career
Patterson has been an executive in the health care sector and for decades has been a local advocate in that field, served as a member of the Oregon Disabilities Commission and chaired the Marion County Health Advisory Board. She is a Congregational minister.

Elections
In November 2018, Patterson ran against incumbent Republican state senator Jackie Winters and lost. Winters died in office. On November 3, 2020, Patterson defeated incumbent Republican appointee Denyc Boles in a special general election to fill the remaining two years of Winters' term, although the results of the election were not certified until weeks after the election.

References

Living people
Democratic Party Oregon state senators
Politicians from Salem, Oregon
Women state legislators in Oregon
Place of birth missing (living people)
Year of birth missing (living people)
Seattle Pacific University alumni
21st-century American women